Kozun is a surname. Notable people with this surname include:

 Brandon Kozun (born 1990), Canadian ice hockey player
 Karol Kozuń (born 1982), Polish Paralympic athlete
 Taran Kozun (born 1994), Canadian ice hockey player

See also
 

Polish-language surnames